Warring Park is a California Historical Landmark as it is the site that Portolà expedition found the Chumash people group known as the Piru Indian tribe August 11, 1769. This site is in the current town of Piru, California in Ventura County. The site became California Historical Landmark number 624 on October 31, 1957. The Site is just west of Piru Creek and north of Lake Piru.

The Portolà expedition was a first Spanish voyage of exploration started in 1769 and ending in 1770. It was the first recorded European exploration of the interior of the present-day California. The leader was Gaspar de Portolà who became the governor of Las Californias. After the expedition, Spain founded Alta California. They built missions, Pueblos, and Presidio-forts. 

The California Historical Landmark reads:

On August 11, 1769, the explorers and priests accompanying Portolá found a populous village of Piru Indians near this point. Carrying their bowstrings loose, the Indians offered necklaces of stones, in exchange for which Portolá presented them with beads.

References

See also
California Historical Landmarks in Ventura County, California
List of Registered Historic Places in Ventura County, California
 Ventura County Historic Landmarks & Points of Interest
Timeline of the Portolá expedition

California Historical Landmarks